Imelda Bautista Schweighart, better known by her former screen name Imee Hart (born 29 May 1995) is a Filipino-German model, singer-songwriter, composer, actress beauty queen who was crowned Miss Philippines Earth 2016 on 11 June 2016, served as the Philippine representative to the Miss Earth 2016 pageant at the Mall of Asia Arena in Manila, Philippines but unplaced and became the third representative of the Philippines who did not place in Miss Earth. 
Before being crowned as Miss Philippines Earth 2016, Schweighart first joined Binibining Pilipinas 2013 and was ranked among the Top 15 finalists in the competition, aside from bagging the Binibining Pilipinas-PAGCOR special award. She also is Miss Puerto Princesa 2016.

She was part of variety show Willing Willie as one of the co-hosts of Willie Revillame at 15 years old from 2010 to 2011 and was also part of the lead cast of youth-oriented drama series Bagets: Just Got Lucky, both aired on TV5. She was also a swimmer during her school years.

References

(Resigned)
(Successor)

1995 births
Miss Philippines Earth winners
Filipino people of German descent
Binibining Pilipinas contestants
Living people
People from Puerto Princesa
Filipino television actresses
Miss Earth 2016 contestants